The following are the national records in track cycling in Brazil maintained by Brazil's national cycling federation: Confederação Brasileira de Ciclismo (CBC).

Men

Women

References

External links
 CBC web site

Brazil
Records
Track cycling
track cycling